Annamari Dancha (née Annamari Chundak; ; born 26 March 1990 in Onokivtsi, Ukrainian SSR) is a Ukrainian snowboarder, specializing in alpine snowboarding. She is silver medalist of the 2019 World championships in parallel slalom. She competed at the 2010, 2014 and 2018 Winter Olympics for Ukraine.

Career
Annamari Chundak made her World Cup debut in October 2006. Until 2010 Winter Olympics, she managed to qualify for the knockout stage only once – on 6 February 2010, in German Sudelfeld, where she was 14th. She competed at the 2007 European Youth Olympic Winter Festival in Spanish Jaca, where she was 4th in giant slalom and 6th in parallel giant slalom.

At the 2010 Winter Olympics, she surprisingly qualified 16th in the parallel giant slalom, but lost in the round of 16 to Marion Kreiner, finishing 16th. Later that year, she became junior world champion in the parallel giant slalom in Snow Park, New Zealand. She is also a two-time silver medalist of Winter Universiades in parallel giant slalom: in 2011 in Turkish Erzurum and 2017 in Kazakh Almaty. At the 2013 Winter Universiade, she achieved 7th rank in the parallel giant slalom competition.

At the 2014 Winter Olympics, she was 21st in the qualifying run of the parallel giant slalom and 21st in the parallel slalom, not advancing in either event.

In January 2015, she married and took a two-year pause in competing.

Before the 2022 Winter Games, her best finish was 8th in a parallel giant slalom in Bulgarian Bansko in the 2017–18 season. That season was quite successful for her: 1 finish in Top-8 and four more finishes in Top-16. She qualified to represent Ukraine at the 2018 Winter Olympics in Pyeongchang. In parallel giant slalom, she finished 28th which was last place due to her disastrous first run.

In February 2019, she ranked 6th in the parallel giant slalom event at the World Championships which was the best ever result for Ukraine at snowboarding competitions of the highest level. But the next day, she surprised everybody by winning a silver medal in parallel slalom, which was the first-ever medal for Ukraine at international snowboard competitions of the highest level. She was just 15th in the qualifying round after finishing 21st on the blue course and 8th on the red course. In the first round, she won against #2 of the qualification Cheyenne Loch from Germany. Later on, Dancha won against Polish Aleksandra Król and 2018 Winter Olympics bronze medalist German Ramona Theresia Hofmeister. In the final, she lost to Julie Zogg from Switzerland, thus winning the silver medal. Interesting fact that these athletes met each other in the final for the second time. Nine years ago, Dancha (Chundak back then) won against Zogg in the final of the parallel giant slalom at the Junior World Championships.

As of January 2022, her best World Cup finish was 5th in the parallel giant slalom on January 11, 2020, in Swiss Scuol.

In 2022, Dancha was nominated for her fourth Winter Games in Beijing.

Career results

Winter Olympics

World Championships

World Cup

Rankings

European Cup

Podiums

Nor-Am Cup

Podiums

Personal life
She studied at the Uzhhorod National University. She is married and has a daughter. She speaks English and Hungarian.

References

External links
 
 

1990 births
Living people
Olympic snowboarders of Ukraine
Snowboarders at the 2010 Winter Olympics
Snowboarders at the 2014 Winter Olympics
Snowboarders at the 2018 Winter Olympics
Snowboarders at the 2022 Winter Olympics
Ukrainian female snowboarders
Universiade medalists in snowboarding
Universiade silver medalists for Ukraine
Competitors at the 2017 Winter Universiade
Competitors at the 2013 Winter Universiade
Competitors at the 2011 Winter Universiade
Sportspeople from Zakarpattia Oblast